Star Supply Stores was a leading chain of British grocers.

History
The business was founded in Manchester in 1873 by Joseph Cadman and James Fish as the Star Tea Company. Soon, many towns in England had their own Star Supply Store, as immortalised in a verse from John Betjeman's poem Myfanwy:

 
Smooth down the Avenue glitters the bicycle,
Black-stockinged legs under navy blue serge,
Home and Colonial, Star, International,
Balancing bicycle leant on the verge.

In 1922 the company, which by then had built up a chain of over 300 shops, bought Ridgways, a leading blender. In 1929 Star Supply Stores was acquired by International Tea Co. Stores.

References

Retail companies established in 1873
Companies based in Manchester
Retail companies disestablished in 1929
Defunct retail companies of the United Kingdom
1873 establishments in England
1929 disestablishments in England
British companies disestablished in 1929
British companies established in 1873